English Australia, formerly known as ELICOS Association of Australia, is an industry association of English language schools for students from overseas studying in Australia.

ELICOS stands for English Language Intensive Courses for Overseas Students and is designed for students who need to learn English before commencing formal studies in Australia.

English Courses 
English language courses vary greatly, depending on the place of study. Going to small group tuition, secondary school/college, university or a vocational education centre will lead to different experiences. Prospective students consider what stage of life they are in and how each school will help them. Schools are diverse, allowing many career paths to be chosen, for example some schools are good at providing simple high school qualifications, while others lead to enrollment in TAFE or university education.

ELICOS Standards 
CRICOS stands for Commonwealth Register of Institutions and Courses for Overseas Students. If an ELICOS provider has met the national standards, then they will be registered with CRICOS.

All of the Australian education providers that offer courses to people studying in Australia on student visas (and the courses that are offered) are listed on the website. The government site also provides information about registration of institutions and courses for overseas students.

English Tests 
There are quite a few options for potential students regarding the selection of an English course. This also applies to English tests. The following tests are accepted for Australian Student Visa purposes:

IELTS – International English Language Testing System test.

TOEFL iBT – Test of English as a Foreign Language internet-Based test OR TOEFL PBT – TOEFL Paper-Based Test (where IELTS is not available).

PTE – Pearson Test of English.

CAE – Cambridge English: Advanced test (Certificate in Advanced English), and the

OET – Occupational English Test for healthcare professionals who want to register and work in an English-speaking environment.

Applying for ELICOS 
There are three main ways that to apply to study ELICOS in Australia. The first is by applying directly to the school. The ELICOS website provides users with a list of all ELICOS English colleges across Australia. Many of these colleges are quality endorsed by NEAS Australia.

The second way to apply is through IE (Australian Education International).

Finally, the third way in which you can apply to ELICOS is through a private education agent representing the schools. You can find an agent by contacting the Australian Embassy in the first instance and asking to be connected to an ‘Education Agent’.

Costs of Study 
The cost of tuition will vary depending on where you are studying. This can vary from approximately AUD$250 per week up to AUD$350 per week (this involves about 25 hours of tuition in the week of study). If you are attending an ELICOS course of study in a main city such as Sydney or Melbourne, the costs will be a higher than in more rural or smaller communities. Adelaide, Perth and Hobart tend to be less expensive than the mainland cities on the eastern coast of Australia, so if you are concerned about finances (including living expenses) then consider these locations as an alternative.

There are at least half a dozen places to study ELICOS in each main city across Australia so make sure you choose wisely, taking all factors into account including cost of living, accommodation, transport, testing requirements and restrictions.

External links

Schools in Australia
Students in Australia